This is a list of singles which have reached number one on the Irish Singles Chart in 1978.

17 Number Ones
Most weeks at No. 1 (artist): John Travolta (14), Olivia Newton-John (14)
Most weeks at No. 1 (song): "You're The One That I Want" - John Travolta and Olivia Newton-John (9)
Most No.1s: John Travolta (3), Olivia Newton-John (3)
4 songs from the film Grease reached No. 1:  "You're The One That I Want", "Summer Nights", "Sandy" and "Hopelessly Devoted to You"

See also
1978 in music
Irish Singles Chart
List of artists who reached number one in Ireland

1978 in Irish music
1978 record charts
1978